Derek Howard Turner (15 May 1931 – 1 August 1985) was an English museum curator and art historian who specialised in liturgical studies and illuminated manuscripts. He worked at the British Museum and the British Library from 1956 until his death, focusing on exhibitions, scholarship, and loans.

Following several years spent at a hospital and at an Anglican Benedictine abbey, Turner found employment in the British Museum's Department of Manuscripts at the age of 25. Serving first as assistant keeper, and later as deputy keeper, within two years of his hiring he helped the museum select manuscripts for purchase from the Dyson Perrins collection and organised his first exhibition; in the 1960s he also took teaching posts at the Universities of Cambridge and East Anglia.

Turner moved to the British Library when custodianship of the museum's library elements changed in 1973. At the library, he helped oversee several major exhibitions, and organise the international loans of significant works. He was closely involved with the lending of a copy of Magna Carta for the 1976 United States Bicentennial celebrations, and in succeeding years helped arrange the loans of several medieval manuscripts for the first time in half a millennium. Two such loans sent the Gospels of Tsar Ivan Alexander to Bulgaria for the first time since the 1300s, and the Moutier-Grandval Bible to Switzerland, its home throughout the Middle Ages.

Early life and education 
Turner was born on 15 May 1931 in Northampton, in central England. An only child, he was born to the World War I veteran Maurice Finnemore Turner and his wife Eva ( Howard). After attending Winchester House School in Brackley, in the summer of 1945 Turner was sent on scholarship to Harrow. In 1950, a Harrow scholarship to read modern history sent him to Hertford College at the University of Oxford; he graduated in the summer of 1953.

Before his employment at the British Museum, Turner worked at a hospital, and spent time at the Anglican Benedictine abbey Nashdom. There he both studied and practised liturgy, and met the medieval music specialist Dom Anselm Hughes.

Career

At the British Museum 
Turner began work as an assistant keeper of the Department of Manuscripts at the British Museum on 3 December 1956. Influenced by his time at Nashdom, he specialised in medieval liturgical studies, and influenced by the lavish decoration of liturgical manuscripts, he likewise studied illuminated manuscripts.

In 1958, Turner organised his first exhibition, showcasing a collection of Byzantine manuscripts. The same year he helped the museum select illuminated manuscripts to purchase from the collection of Charles William Dyson Perrins, before it was offered publicly. The museum acquired ten of the collection's 154 manuscripts, including two bequests by Perrins, and eight purchases at a collective and below-market . These included the Gorleston Psalter, the Khamsa of Nizami, and the book of hours by William de Brailes, and were the subject of a paper by Turner the following year. Upon the December 1960 resignation of Julian Brown, a co-author of the paper who left for the chair of palaeography at King's College London, Turner assumed responsibility for the museum's collection of illustrated manuscripts.

In his new role heading the collection of illustrated manuscripts, Turner focused on scholarship. His resulting publications ranged from those that his colleagues described as "extremely erudite", to those aimed at a popular audience. In 1965 alone, Turner published four books: Early Gothic Illuminated Manuscripts in England, the fifth volume of the British Museum's Reproductions from Illuminated Manuscripts (highlighting acquisitions made since the 1928 fourth volume), English Book illustration, 966–1846 (timed to coincide with the Fourth International Congress of Bibliophiles), and Reichenau Reconsidered: a Re-assessment of the Place of Reichenau in Ottonian Art, He followed up the first book with Romanesque Illuminated Manuscripts in the British Museum in 1966, with both becoming standard introductions to their subjects. Reichenau Reconsidered, meanwhile, analysed a set of exceptional manuscripts (including the Codex Egberti, Egbert Psalter, and Poussay Gospels) and questioned their traditional attribution as coming from a scriptorium at Reichenau Abbey. If the analysis was not conclusive, it was reviewed as a "far-reaching perusal" that "demands that medievalists rethink their positions on the controversy".

In the mid 1960s, Turner began teaching art history part-time at the Universities of Cambridge and East Anglia, repurposing as teaching material his recent works on English Gothic and European Romanesque illumination. He also undertook the chairmanship of two organisations involved with liturgical studies: the Plainsong and Medieval Music Society in 1964, and the Henry Bradshaw Society in 1967. In 1971, Turner helped secure the Anderson Pontifical for the museum's collection, after it was discovered in the stables of Brodie Castle the previous year and placed for sale at Sotheby's. He was promoted to deputy keeper in 1972, following the retirements of the keeper Theodore Cressy Skeat and the senior deputy keeper Cyril Ernest Wright.

At the British Library 

A year after Turner's promotion to deputy keeper, the Department of Manuscripts was subsumed into the British Library, and he with it; subsequently his role shifted to the curation of exhibitions, and to responsibility for loans from the collection of manuscripts. In the former role Turner helped oversee three major exhibitions: The Christian Orient in 1978, The Benedictines in Britain in 1980, and, with Janet Backhouse and Leslie Webster, The Golden Age of Anglo-Saxon Art in 1984. Turner helped write exhibition catalogues for the latter two. The Benedictines in Britain, attended by the leader of each of the country's Benedictine communities, "allowed him", his colleagues wrote, "to give full rein to one of his favourite pastimes, creating a guest list on which every style and title should appear with absolute accuracy. He spent many happy hours in the bookstacks, consulting directories in pursuit of this perfection!" Turner also inspired the 1983 exhibition Renaissance Painting in Manuscripts: Treasures from the British Library, shown at the J. Paul Getty Museum in Malibu and the Pierpont Morgan Library in New York, before coming to London.

Turner was also responsible for facilitating the international loans of important manuscripts. In the process he enjoyed interacting with the Foreign and Commonwealth Office—and poring over abstruse indemnity arrangements—leading to the loan of a copy of Magna Carta to Washington, D.C. for the 1976 United States Bicentennial celebrations. The copy, the oldest of the four surviving, spent a year in the United States Capitol, where it was viewed by dignitaries including Queen Elizabeth II and Lord Elwyn-Jones. Turner, for his part, maintained a lifelong refusal to cross the Atlantic. The following year, he helped lend the Gospels of Tsar Ivan Alexander to Sofia, Bulgaria, where it received national publicity; it had last been in the country in the fourteenth century. In 1979 he helped lend the Leningrad Bede to the Bede Monastery Museum in Jarrow and to Bloomsbury, and in 1981 Turner saw the Moutier-Granval Bible return to Jura, Switzerland, its home throughout the Middle Ages.

Personal life 
Turner was described in The Times as "[a]n intensely sensitive spirit, ... for whom living was no easy matter"; colleagues remembered him as "a memorable—if unpredictable—character". An only child unused to close-knit family life, he enjoyed the company of those a generation or profession removed from him over that of his peers and contemporaries. Learning that the son of a commuting acquaintance was interested in Anglo-Saxon literature, Turner invited the two to the library to handle the Beowulf manuscripts, but among colleagues he had "a not undeserved reputation for being difficult and could chill the blood of the more timid". He nevertheless shared a close working relationship with Janet Backhouse, also of the British Museum and later Library, and introduced her to the exhibition and loans of manuscripts.

The unexpected death of his mother in 1966–1967, and his father's subsequent move into a nursing home, precipitated what Backhouse termed a "radical change" in Turner's life. He moved from his bedsitter by Kew Gardens to his parents' flat in Henley-on-Thames, his dress became flamboyant, and his published output declined. Much of his social interaction came at the museum and library; once offered several months' leave by the keeper of manuscripts Daniel Waley to work on a Yates Thompson manuscript catalogue, which Turner thought could be his magnum opus, he nevertheless declined, lest he sacrifice his daily interactions with colleagues.

Turner died suddenly on 1 August 1985. Obituaries were published in The Times, and in a special issue of The British Library Journal, featuring contributions related to his own range of interests.  Various studies were also published in his memory, including "The Text of the Benedictional of St Æthelwold", a paper begun by Turner and finished by Andrew Prescott, then of the British Library.

Publications 
Turner published widely, beginning soon after his employment at the British Museum. After his promotion to deputy keeper his output dwindled, and primarily focused on current exhibitions and recent acquisitions. Such later publications included a facsimile of the Hastings Hours, one of the library's greatest Flemish manuscripts, which was bequeathed to the collection under his watch. With the work "almost ignored previously", one reviewer wrote, Turner's facsimile was "stunning visually and always interesting"; another described a "brilliant introduction" that focused on history rather than art criticism.

Books

Articles

Chapters

References

Bibliography 
 
  
  
  
  
  
  
  
  
  
 Also published online.
  
  
  
  
  
  
 
 

1931 births
1985 deaths
Academics of the University of Cambridge
Academics of the University of East Anglia
Alumni of Hertford College, Oxford
British medievalists
Employees of the British Museum
Employees of the British Library
English art historians
English librarians
People educated at Harrow School
People from Northampton